This is a list of American non-fiction environmental writers.

See also
List of environmental books
List of non-fiction environmental writers

External links
Environmental Writers
How Writers Created the Environmental Movement - U.S. News & World Report

Writers
 
non-fiction environmental writers, List of American
Non-fiction